William McCormick (born c. 1928) was a Canadian football player who played for the Toronto Argonauts. He won the Grey Cup with them in 1950. He played college football at Miami University in Oxford, Ohio. He is a member of the Miami Redhawks Athletics Hall of Fame, inducted in 1982.

References

1920s births
Toronto Argonauts players
Possibly living people